Rev. John Lowell (born in Boston, Massachusetts on March 14, 1704; died in Newburyport, Massachusetts on May 17, 1767) was a colonial Massachusetts clergyman. He was the first minister in the history of Newburyport, Massachusetts and the father of John Lowell, the delegate to the Congress of the Confederation.

Biography
John Lowell was the son of Ebenezer Lowell and Elizabeth Shailer. His great-grandfather, Percival Lowell (sometimes spelled Lowle), was the Lowell family immigrant ancestor. John Lowell was educated at Harvard University, graduating in 1721. He became the first minister of Newburyport, holding this position from 1726 to 1767.

See also
 Lowell family

References

External links
 Oil Painting of Rev. Lowell

1704 births
1767 deaths
American clergy
People of colonial Massachusetts
Harvard University alumni
18th-century American clergy